Juliana Schroeder is an American behavioral scientist and academic. She is a professor at University of California, Berkeley.

Education
Schroeder's educational background includes a B.A. in psychology and economics from the University of Virginia, an M.B.A. from the University of Chicago Booth School of Business, and an M.A. and Ph.D. in Psychology and Business from the University of Chicago.

Career
Schroeder teaches at the Haas School of Business. She is the director of the Experimental Social Science Laboratory (Xlab) at UC Berkeley, as well as a faculty affiliate in the Social Psychology Department, the Cognition Department, and the Center for Human-Compatible AI at UC Berkeley.

Schroeder is the cofounder and director of the Psychology of Technology Institute, which supports and advances scientific research regarding the psychological consequences and antecedents of technological advancements.

Schroeder also occupies a number of academic roles outside of Haas. She is an elected member of the Society for Personality and Social Psychology, American Psychological Society, Society for Judgment and Decision Making, Academy of Management, International Association of Conflict Management, Association for Consumer Research. Schroeder also serves as an ad-hoc reviewer of peer-reviewed journals such as Organizational Behavior and Human Decision Processes, Group Processes and Intergroup Relations, and Academy of Management.

Schroeder's research examines how people make social judgments and decisions. She studies the psychological processes underlying how people think about the minds of those around them, and how their judgments then influence their decisions and interactions.

Awards and honors
 Early Career Award, International Association of Conflict Management (2019)
 The International Social Cognition Network Early Career Award, 2018
 Association for Psychological Science Rising Star, 2017

Selected papers and publications
Conversation and Mind Perception
 Schroeder, J., Kardas, M., & Epley, N. (2017). The humanizing voice: Speech reveals, and text conceals, a more thoughtful mind in the midst of disagreement. Psychological Science, 28, 1745–1762.
 Schroeder, J., & Epley, N. (2016). Mistaking minds and machines: How speech affects dehumanization and anthropomorphism. Journal of Experimental Psychology: General, 145, 1427–1437.
 Schroeder, J., & Epley, N. (2015). The sound of intellect: Speech reveals a thoughtful mind, increasing a job candidate's appeal. Psychological Science, 26, 877–891.

“Lesser Minds”: Causes and Consequences of Dehumanization
 Schroeder, J., & Epley, N. (2020). Demeaning: Dehumanizing others by minimizing the importance of their psychological needs. Journal of Personality and Social Psychology.
 Schroeder, J., Waytz, A., & Epley, N. (2017). Endorsing help for others that you oppose for yourself: Mind perception alters the perceived effectiveness of paternalism. Journal of Experimental Psychology: General, 146, 1106–1125.
 Schroeder, J., & Risen, J.L. (2016). Befriending the enemy: Outgroup friendship longitudinally predicts intergroup attitudes in a co-existence program for Israelis and Palestinians. Group Processes and Intergroup Relations, 19, 72–93.
 Waytz, A., Schroeder, J., & Epley, N. (2014). The lesser minds problem. In Bain, P., Vaes, J., & Leyens, J. P. (Eds.) Humanness and Dehumanization (pp. 49–67). New York, NY: Psychology Press.

Instrumental Relationships and Objectifying Interactions
 Schroeder, J., Fishbach, A., Schein, C., & Gray, K. (2017). Functional intimacy: Needing—but not wanting—the touch of a stranger. Journal of Personality and Social Psychology, 113, 910–924.
 Schroeder, J., Caruso, E., & Epley, N. (2016). Many hands make overlooked work: Overclaiming of responsibility increases with group size. Journal of Experimental Psychology: Applied, 22, 238–246.
 Schroeder, J., & Fishbach, A. (2015). The “empty vessel” physician: Physicians’ instrumentality makes them seem personally empty. Social Psychological and Personality Science, 6, 940–949.

References

External links

Haas School of Business faculty
Year of birth missing (living people)
Living people
Behaviourist psychologists
American women psychologists
21st-century American psychologists
21st-century American women scientists
University of Chicago Booth School of Business alumni
University of Virginia alumni
American women academics